The 2020 United States presidential election in North Dakota was held on Tuesday, November 3, 2020, as part of the 2020 United States presidential election in which all 50 states plus the District of Columbia participated. North Dakota voters chose electors to represent them in the Electoral College via a popular vote, pitting the Republican Party's nominee, incumbent President Donald Trump from Florida, and running mate Vice President Mike Pence from Indiana against Democratic Party nominee, former Vice President Joe Biden from Delaware, and his running mate Senator Kamala Harris of California. North Dakota has three electoral votes in the Electoral College.

Trump won North Dakota 65.1% to 31.7%, a margin of 33.4%, about three points down from his 36-point victory in 2016. North Dakota, a rural state covered in the Midwestern Plains, is one of the most reliably Republican states in the nation. It last voted for a Democrat in 1964, when Lyndon B. Johnson carried it against the backdrop of his nationwide landslide victory. Since 1964, the Peace Garden State has been competitive in only three elections: 1976, 1996, and 2008. A few prime reasons why this state votes heavily for Republicans include its older, majority-White populace; agribusiness; and the state's recent oil boom. In recent presidential elections, Bakken shale oil has been a major driver of conservative success in the state, as the oil boom increasingly fuels the economy of North Dakota. The main oil boom has taken place in the western counties—perhaps Trump's main base. Trump signed executive orders on his first month in office, reviving the Keystone and Dakota Access Pipelines rejected by the Obama administration. Despite Biden's modest improvement over Hillary Clinton four years earlier, this remains the second-worst Democratic performance in the state since 1980.

Joe Biden won the same two counties Hillary Clinton won in 2016: the majority-Native American counties of Rolette and Sioux, both of which have long been Democratic strongholds. However, Biden only came 2.7 points short of winning Cass County, which holds the state's largest city of Fargo, as compared to Clinton's 10.5-point loss in 2016. Biden became the first Democrat to win the presidency without winning Sargent County since Franklin D. Roosevelt in 1944 and the first without Benson, Ransom, or Steele Counties since John F. Kennedy in 1960.

Caucuses

Democratic caucuses

The North Dakota Democratic–NPL Party held a firehouse caucus on March 10, 2020.

Republican caucuses
The North Dakota Republican Party held a non-binding firehouse caucus on March 10, 2020, with incumbent President Donald Trump running unopposed.

The party will then formally select their 29 Republican National Convention delegates, unpledged to any particular candidate at the state party convention. The state party convention was originally scheduled for March 27–29, but due to concerns over the COVID-19 pandemic it was ultimately cancelled.

Libertarian nominee
Jo Jorgensen, Psychology Senior Lecturer at Clemson University

General election

Final predictions

Polling

Graphical summary

Polls with a sample size of <100 have their sample size entries marked in red to indicate a lack of reliability.

Aggregate polls

Polls

with Donald Trump and Michael Bloomberg

with Donald Trump and Pete Buttigieg

with Donald Trump and Amy Klobuchar

with Donald Trump and Bernie Sanders

with Donald Trump and Elizabeth Warren

Electoral slates
These slates of electors were nominated by each party in order to vote in the Electoral College should their candidate win the state:

Results

Results by county

By congressional district
Due to the state's low population, only one congressional district is allocated. This district is called the At-Large district, because it covers the entire state, and thus is equivalent to the statewide election results.

See also
 United States presidential elections in North Dakota
 Presidency of Joe Biden
 2020 United States presidential election
 2020 Democratic Party presidential primaries
 2020 Libertarian Party presidential primaries
 2020 Republican Party presidential primaries
 2020 United States elections

Notes

Partisan clients

References

Further reading

External links
 
 
  (state affiliate of the U.S. League of Women Voters)
 

North Dakota
2020
Presidential